The U.S. Air Force Nurse Corps ensures the health of military personnel and their family members.

Entry requirements
New members of the Air Force Nurse Corps are required to hold at minimum a Bachelor of Science in Nursing (BSN) degree prior to receiving a commission.

Roles
Members of the Air Force Nurse Corps come from all aspects of Air Force Medicine and can serve in roles including flight nurse, nurse practitioner or nurse anesthetist.

History

Chief of the Air Force Nurse Corps
The first Chief of the Air Force Nurse Corps was Colonel Verena Marie Zeller (1949–1956). Brigadier-General E. Ann Hoefly was appointed chief in 1968. The first two-star general Chief of the Air Force Nurse Corps was Major General Barbara Brannon; she was replaced in 2005 by Maj Gen Melissa Rank. In 2008, it was announced that Colonel Kimberly Siniscalchi would be promoted to the rank of Major General and serve as the Chief of the AF Nurse Corps, thereby bypassing the rank of Brigadier General (1-star).

Notable members

See also
United States Army Nurse Corps
United States Navy Nurse Corps

References

Further reading
 Judith Barger, Beyond the Call of Duty: Army Flight Nursing in World War II (2013) excerpt

Nurse
Military nursing
Nursing organizations in the United States